Ferdinandus Carolus Hardijns (16 September 1864 – 13 May 1927) was a Belgian trade unionists and politician.

Born in Ghent, Hardijns worked in a factory and was a founding member of the Belgian Labour Party, in 1885.  The following year, he became the editor of Vooruit, a socialist newspaper.  In it, he printed an appeal for the police not to shoot striking workers, and when he refused to print a response to the article, he was sentenced to two months in prison or a 200 franc fine.

In 1895, Hardijns became the general secretary of the International Federation of Textile Workers' Associations, serving for two years.  Also in 1895, he was elected as a city councillor in Ghent, serving until 1926.

References

1864 births
1927 deaths
Belgian Labour Party politicians
Newspaper editors
Belgian trade unionists
People from Ghent